The Castlepollard Mother & Baby Home (also known as the Sacred Heart Home or Manor House) that operated between 1935 and 1971 in the village of Castlepollard, County Westmeath, Ireland, was a maternity home for unmarried mothers and their children. The Home was run by the Sisters of the Sacred Hearts of Jesus and Mary, a religious order of Catholic nuns.

4,972 unmarried pregnant women were sent to the Home to give birth and work. 4,559 children are known to have been born in the home, often with little medical assistance. High infant mortality, forced adoptions and abuse have been recorded at the Home. Castlepollard was just one of 18 homes investigated by the Irish government following the discovery of the remains of hundreds of babies at the Bon Secours Mother and Baby Home in Tuam, County Galway and Bessborough in County Cork. The report detailed over three decades of abuse and negligence resulting in the deaths of hundreds of children. Others children were adopted to families in Ireland and the US, often in exchange for money, after mother's were forced to sign over their children to the Sisters of the Sacred Hearts.

History

Established in 1935 with capacity for 37 women and 20 children, the Sisters of the Sacred Hearts of Jesus and Mary opened Castlepollard for unmarried, pregnant women. By 1937, 56 women and 48 children were registered at the Home, by 1941 the population had increased to more than three times the Home's capacity with some forced to sleep in the nearby barn and at least 34 infants were known to have died. Following state intervention, only one new admission was accepted in 1941 with other mothers being sent to Sean Ross Abbey in County Tipperary or Bessborough. In 1942 capacity was expanded to house 109 women and their children. Women were sent to the home from across Westmeath and neighbouring counties, including County Meath, County Cavan, and County Offaly. After expansion it began to take in women from County Longford, County Louth and County Monaghan. Early opposition to its establishment came from the Meath Board of Health in Trim, who argued that moving unmarried women to Castlepollard would hinder the capacity of the Health Board's own laundry service.

By 1945 Dr Ward, a Meath councillor had raised a list of concerns about the Home to authorities. These included beatings and forced hard labour for undernourished pregnant women beginning at 5:30a. Dr Ward reported that some children with diarrhea were neglected to the extent that their intestines protruded. Nurseries were reportedly unheated with windows left open year round. Unsurprisingly, the death rate amongst infants was above 10%, however this was an improvement from a high of 30%.

The women taken into the home were often very young, nationally 11% were under 18, or suffered from mental disabilities. Many, including Residents A and H who gave evidence to the investigation, had been raped. In 1946 a man was convicted of having 'carnal knowledge' of a 'feeble-minded' woman of 'low mentality.' The man was given a year of hard labour as punishment, his victim was placed in the Mother and Baby Home where some women were put to work for over three years and had to give up their children. The youngest expectant mother sent to Castelpollard was 12 

In 1949 the infant death rate at the Home declined to a national average 3%, prompting words of praise from Department of Local Government and Public Health inspector, Miss Lister: "This is the lowest death rate yet in our special homes for mothers and babies and I think some recognition should be conveyed to the community and the doctor. The health of the children is on the whole, excellent, and they are well cared for." The official investigation interviewed some of those present at the time who described being beaten with sticks.

By the 1950s and 1960s adoption became the dominant manner of departures for infants at Castlepollard, 43 were adopted by families in the US in 1958. Official infant death rates at the Home remained near the national average in this period. The Home also began taking in children born with severe mental disabilities from married families who were unable to look after them. The tales of abuse these children faced at the Homes are outlined by survivors who contributed to the government report.

Closure due to declining numbers was discussed as early as 1959, however concerns were raised that Sean Ross Abbey and Bon Secours Mother and Baby Home in Tuam were also scheduled for closure may leave the remaining Sacred Heart Home in Bessborough dangerously overcrowded. Closure finally occurred in 1971 with the site becoming a home for disabled children, and other people described as ‘mental defectives’ by the organisation. Sean Ross Abbey became a similar institution a year earlier, while the Mother & Baby Home in Tuam had closed in 1960.

In 2021, the Sisters of the Sacred Hearts issued an apology. The Sisters of the Sacred Heart apology said that "Irish society demanded that many unmarried women would have their babies in secret. Some religious communities provided a service in response to these societal norms and demands, driven by the secrecy and shame which surrounded pregnancy out of wedlock." The apology went on to say that although "we are distressed and saddened that it is so difficult to prove with legal certainty where many of these infants were buried" they wished to "recognise and place on record that many of our Sisters over the decades dedicated their lives and worked tirelessly in providing care for women and children."

Life at Castlepollard 

Unmarried pregnant women were sent to Castlepollard to work off the sin of pregnancy outside of marriage. They were given 'House Names' and forbidden from revealing any personal information that may reveal who they had been before they entered the Home. Work often involved running a laundry for local businesses and churches who took advantage of the cheap process offered by the nuns. Other tasks could also be given to women, including chopping down trees and cleaning. Others were tasked with looking after the children. Women could be expected to work from 5:30am until 9pm with some breaks. Few accommodations were given to the heavily pregnant or new mothers and births were overseen by junior nuns who were often untrained, particularly for complex births. Little pain relief or other medical assistance was offered including to children when they fell ill.

Babies were breastfed for a few months to reduce costs, but women were forbidden from spending too much time with their children in case they developed a mutual bond. Babies were weaned prematurely and put onto insufficient diets early on, contributing to the high death rate in the institution. Survivors tell of violent beatings, malnourishment, mental torture and isolation. Those who did not survive were buried in unmarked near the Home. Some babies were buried in shoeboxes.

Estimates of how many infants died at Castlepollard vary. A confirmed low figure of 247 is given by the report, but does not include those with unclear locations of death. At least 9 Mothers died at the Home.

Comparisons with other Mother & Baby Homes 

The number of fatalities at Castlepollard is likely the lowest death toll of the three Sacred Heart Mother & Baby Home's in Ireland: 921 children died at Bessborough, and 1,024 at the Sean Ross Abbey in Roscrea. Tuam, the Home which brought the issue of infant mortality at the Homes to attention of the public was run by a separate organisation and recorded 796 child deaths, they were buried in a septic tank. Some state run homes, including Stranorlar Mother & Baby Home also saw more fatalities St Patrick's Mother and Baby Home, or 'Pelletstown' in Dublin may have had the highest death toll anywhere in Ireland with at least 3,512 deaths recorded by the official investigation.
No reburials have been undertaken at any Mother and Baby Home in Ireland.

Similar finds have occurred elsewhere in other Homes run by Catholic organisations elsewhere, including at Kamloops Indian Residential School in Canada, Smyllum Park, Lanarkshire. and St Josephs Orphanage, Vermont.

See also

 Bethany Mother and Child Home
 Cavan Orphanage Fire
 St Patrick's Mother and Baby Home
 Bessborough Mother & Baby Home
 Magdalene Laundries in Ireland
 Bon Secours Mother and Baby Home
 Stranorlar County Mother & Baby Home
 St Patrick's Mother and Baby Home
2021 Canadian Indian residential schools gravesite discoveries

References 

2014 in the Republic of Ireland
2017 in the Republic of Ireland
2018 in the Republic of Ireland
2021 in the Republic of Ireland
Bon Secours Sisters
Buildings and structures in County Westmeath
Burials in the Republic of Ireland
Child abuse in the Republic of Ireland
History of Catholicism in Ireland
Mass graves
Religion in County Westmeath
Scandals in the Republic of Ireland
Poor law infirmaries
Mother and baby homes in Ireland
1925 establishments in Ireland
1961 disestablishments in Ireland